Randolph-Macon Academy (R-MA) is a coeducational private boarding school with an elite Air Force JROTC component. R-MA serves students in grades 6-12 and maintains a 100% college acceptance rate every year with each class averaging over $14 million in scholarships. 

The 135-acre (0.55 km2) campus overlooks Front Royal, and is located 70 miles (110 km) west of Washington, D.C. It is one of six private military schools in Virginia.

Academics and activities
Randolph-Macon Academy is accredited by the Virginia Association of Independent Schools. 

Click here for Academic information. 

Click here for information about our Air Force JROTC Component.

History

 1892: Randolph-Macon Academy was founded by Dr. William W. Smith as part of the Randolph-Macon College preparatory school program. The original  campus had one main building which housed classrooms as well as dormitories. The original building resembled a castle in its design and architecture.
 1917: Randolph-Macon Academy transformed into a military school. The program later undertook the title of the "National Defense Cadet Corps."
 1922: Randolph-Macon Academy finished paying off all but one of its original debts. Later this year, the construction of Rives Hall began. This new building served as an auxiliary gymnasium.
 1927: On January 10, the original building built in 1892 burned down completely. The origin of the fire which destroyed the building is unknown. As a new building was being constructed, the academy continued to operate. The cadets were housed by local residents and classes took place in municipal buildings until a new building, known as the "Main Building", was completed in October 1927. The Main Building was listed on the National Register of Historic Places in 1987 as Sonner Hall.
 1929: With the onset of the Great Depression, Randolph-Macon Academy fell on hard times.
 1933–34: In an effort to reduce losses, Randolph Macon's military academy in Bedford, Virginia was closed. Cadets from Bedford were moved to Front Royal for the 1933–34 school year.
1953: Randolph-Macon Academy officially and legally separates from Randolph-Macon College and becomes its own entity.
 1954: Randolph-Macon Academy began a massive expansion stage in its history. The school purchased an additional  of land, built a headmaster's home, staff living quarters, and Melton Gymnasium. Also, Rives Hall was converted to classroom use.
 1960s: Although public attitudes about military school structure were beginning to change, Randolph-Macon Academy held onto the same disciplinary principles as in previous decades. Critics complained that the military school concept was antiquated, and should all together be eliminated. Like the other six military schools in Virginia, Randolph-Macon Academy was able to maintain a large and steady enrollment primarily because of forced public school integration (although R-MA amended its admission policy on race and ethnicity in 1966). This temporary enrollment boost collapsed at the end of the decade. During this era, a 500-seat chapel was constructed with the financial aid of The United Methodist Church.
 1970s: The enrollment at Randolph-Macon Academy dropped dramatically. This was largely in part of the general American consensus of less uniformity during that decade and the economic instability of the United States of America during that time.  
 1971: Randolph-Macon Academy admitted its first African American applicant.
 1974: The school abandoned its all male enrollment policy and turned co-educational for the first time in its history.
 1975: In an effort to bolster the low enrollment base, Randolph-Macon Academy adopted the United States Air Force Junior ROTC program.
 1981: Col. Trevor D. Turner (USA, Ret.) was hired as President (1981-1997).  Col. Turner is credited with saving the Academy and its extraordinary turn-around during the 1980s and 1990s.
 1980s: Randolph-Macon Academy managed to increase the applicant base from its lag in the 1970s, and near the end of the decade, Randolph-Macon Academy began another expansionary period. The school annexed an additional , built three new buildings to compensate for the growth in admitted applicants, and increased facilities for female students. These three buildings were Crow Hall, a classroom building, Turner Hall, a female dormitory and new cafeteria, and the Fulton Building, a maintenance facility and musical arts building. A Lower School campus was also built on the Upper School grounds. This "campus within a campus" was established to help younger children become candidates for matriculation into the Upper AFJROTC School.
 1995: A fire destroyed the third and fourth floors of Sonner-Payne Hall. This, along with flooding from the aftermath, destroyed the main building of Randolph-Macon Academy. Several rumors abound as to what caused the fire.  The institution's stated reason is that of a cadet disposing of a cigarette in a hole in the wall in a third floor room, setting fire to the insulation which spread quickly. The student at the time, as well as the local fire department, indicated that the reason was faulty wiring of the old building.  The damages were estimated at around $4.5 million USD. No one was hurt during this event, even though the emergency fire exit doors were chained shut on the upper floors. During reconstruction, cadets lived in an area hotel (the local Super 8 Motel) and attended class as normal, utilizing other facilities on the campus. Sonner-Payne hall was gutted and rebuilt with improvements including computer networking, air conditioning and new windows.
 1997: President and Headmaster Major General Henry M. Hobgood (USAF, Ret.) took his position.
 2005: At the end of the '04-'05 school year, Colonel Ivan G. Meith (USAF, Ret.) retired from his position as Commandant of the school. The next Commandant, Colonel Gary N. Sadler, USAF, took over in the summer of 2005.
 2007: Rifle Range was demolished.
 2009: Stan Fulton Hall, a new academic building housing all of the humanities, was completed. Rives Hall was demolished.
 2011: Melton Memorial Gymnasium was refurbished.
 2013: Maj Gen Henry M. Hobgood, USAF Ret., retired on June 30 after serving 16 years as the president at R-MA. Maj Gen Maurice H. "Maury" Forsyth, USAF Ret., became the 10th president of R-MA on July 1, 2013.
 2014: General Maurice H. "Maury" Forsyth, USAF Ret., 10th president of R-MA, officially resigned on September 19. Upper School Dean Johnathan Ezell became acting president.
 2015: Brig. Gen. David C. Wesley, USAF Ret., became the 11th president of R-MA on March 23.

Notable alumni
 General Walter E. Boomer, USMC, Retired
 Major General William H. Gill, USA, Retired
 Harlan Crow, real estate developer
 Scot Kerns, Lutheran clergyman and member of the Montana legislature.
 Joel Shankle, 1956 Summer Olympics Bronze Medalist in the 110 Hurdles
 RADM John Stufflebeem, USN, Retired

References

External links

Boarding schools in Virginia
Private high schools in Virginia
Private middle schools in Virginia
Preparatory schools in Virginia
Military high schools in the United States
Educational institutions established in 1892
Schools in Warren County, Virginia
Front Royal, Virginia
1892 establishments in Virginia